Tyson Connor Houseman (born February 9, 1990) is a Canadian actor who appeared in The Twilight Saga: New Moon as  Quil Ateara.  Tyson currently performs with two professional theater companies, touring all over the world.

Background

Houseman is a First Nation descendant of the Cree Nation and was born and raised in Edmonton, Alberta. He graduated from Victoria School of the Arts in Edmonton, and has previously been involved in theater productions.  His only major role was in The Twilight Saga: New Moon, and he reprised his role as Quil Ateara in The Twilight Saga: Eclipse.  Houseman and other Twilight saga actors participated in a benefit baseball game in March 2010; the proceeds benefitted earthquake relief efforts in Haiti, as well as the Blood Center of Southeast Louisiana and the 9th Ward Field of Dreams.  After the Twilight films completed filming, Tyson moved to Montreal and attended Concordia University for four years and received his degree in 2014.  

His father, Howie Miller, is a professional comedian associated with the sketch comedy series Caution: May Contain Nuts.

Filmography

References

External links 

1990 births
Canadian male film actors
Living people
Male actors from Edmonton
Canadian people of Cree descent
First Nations male actors